The Kodaikanal Ghat Road has been designated by the Tamil Nadu State Highway Department as SH-156.

The Road is tolled by the Kodaikanal Municipality.

History 
The road was strengthened at a cost of  60 million in 2009. A retention wall was later built due to a landslide.

The Road was used as an alternative when the Adukkam-Periakulam and Adukkam-Perumalmalai ghat roads were shut due to excessive damage.

In 2010, the road was completely blocked after a major landslide occurred due to heavy rainfall.

Accidents 
In 2011, four people were killed when a car plunged into a gorge.

References 

State highways in Tamil Nadu
Toll roads in India